H3N1 is a subtype of the species Influenza A virus, mostly affecting pigs.

The known subtypes of Influenza A virus that create influenza in pigs and are endemic in pigs are H1N1, H1N2, H3N1 and H3N2.

See also
 strains named by isolate
 Fujian flu
 strains named by typical host
 Bird flu
 Dog flu
 Horse flu
 Human flu
 Swine flu

Sources

H3N1